INS Trishul (F43) (Translated as Trident) is the second frigate of the  of the Indian Navy. Trishul, the guided missile frigate, joined the arsenal of Indian Navy in 2003. The ship was commissioned by the then Flag Officer Commanding-in-Chief, Western Naval Command Vice Admiral Arun Prakash at St. Petersburg, Russia on 25 June 2003. It has a complement of 32 officers and 228 sailors. In contrast to the lead ship INS Talwar, the sea trials of Trishul were considerably shortened as the ship performed well. Trishul arrived in Mumbai on 23 September 2003.

Design

Trishul belongs to the Talwar-class of frigates. The Talwar-class guided missile frigates are modified Krivak III-class frigates built by Russia. These ships use stealth technologies and a special hull design to ensure a reduced radar cross section. Much of the equipment on the ship is Russian-made, but a significant number of systems of Indian origin have also been incorporated.

Armament
The surface to air weapons systems include one single-rail MS-196 launcher that can launch the long range Shtil-1 (NATO: SA-17) surface-to-air missile. Eight Igla-1E (NATO: SA-16) portable air defence missiles are on board for short-range threats. Trishul became the second Indian warship to incorporate an eight cell KBSM 3S-14NE Vertical Launcher and was the first to upload the new Indian/Russian designed missile, the supersonic BrahMos PJ-10 ASCM (anti-sub/ship/surface cruise missile). Trishuls VLS can launch the Russian designed 3M-54E Klub-N (NATO: SS-N-27) subsonic ASCM. Trishul has one 100 mm A-190 (E) dual purpose gun mount for surface and air targets. Its rate of fire is 60 rounds a minute at a range of 15 km.

Two Kashtan Air Defence Gun/Missile mounts are Trishuls Close-In Weapons System (CIWS). There are 64 Grison reloads (32 each mount) with a package of four missile taking less than 2 minutes to load. Forward of Trishuls bridge and aft of the VLS is one 12-round RBU-6000 anti-submarine warfare rocket launch that can fire either Splav-90R rockets or RGB-60 depth charges. Two pairs of fixed 533 mm DTA-53 torpedo tubes are located port and starboard midships. Both can launch either SET-65E anti-sub and 53-65KE antiship torpedoes.

Service history

In December 2005, Trishul collided with a commercial ship, Ambuja Laxmi, outside the Mumbai harbour, while returning from a training mission. Radar systems installed by the port authorities and those on board Ambuja Laxmi were unable to detect Trishul, and were unable to prevent the side-on collision.

In the later part of 2017, Trishul was deployed on a four-month long anti piracy mission in the region of Gulf of Aden. The ship started at Mumbai in August 2017, and returned on 23 December 2017. During the period, the ship covered , carried out a bilateral exercise with the Italian Navy, exchange visits with the navies of Italy, Russia, United States, Japan, and Bangladesh. On 06 October 2017, Trishul successfully deterred a pirate attack on an Indian merchant vessel, MV Jag Amar.

References

External links 
Talwar Class - Bharat Rakshak
Talwar Class - Global Security

Talwar-class frigates
Frigates of the Indian Navy
2000 ships
Ships built at the Baltic Shipyard